Life's Too Short is the sixth album by singer/songwriter Marshall Crenshaw.

The album was produced by Ed Stasium and featured Kenny Aronoff on drums. Crenshaw recalled, "I liked what Kenny Aronoff (drums) and Ed Stasium (production) were doing right then, I liked them both personally, and I wanted to work with them, so off we went…"

"Better Back Off" was a moderate hit on the Modern Rock charts, reaching number 17. Crenshaw said of the song, "On 'Better Back Off' you can tell from the music that I'm trying to write a big Rock-radio anthem. But the lyrics don't quite get there – they describe an intimate conversation between two people, not very anthem-like..."

Spin named the album to their list of 30 overlooked albums from 1991, stating, "The Ed Stasium-produced album is full of the kind of literate guitar pop that made Crenshaw a star in the '80s, with catchy gems like 'Delilah' and “Fantastic Planet of Love.

Track listing
All songs written by Marshall Crenshaw, except where noted.
"Better Back Off" (Crenshaw, Tom Teeley) – 4:48
"Don't Disappear Now" (Crenshaw, Teeley) – 4:11
"Fantastic Planet Of Love" – 5:20
"Delilah" (Crenshaw, Leroy Preston) – 4:08
"Face Of Fashion" (Chris Knox) – 3:57
"Stop Doing That" – 4:09
"Walkin' Around" – 4:14
"Starting Tomorrow" – 4:17
"Everything's The Truth" (Crenshaw, Jules Shear) – 3:58
"Somewhere Down The Line" – 6:32

Personnel
Marshall Crenshaw - vocals, guitar, piano, bass, percussion
Kenny Aronoff – drums
Fernando Saunders – bass
Ed Stasium – keyboards, percussion, guitar, vocals
Greg Leisz – slide guitar, frying pan guitar
Peter Case – harmonica
Paul Shaffer – piano, organ
Tommy Price – drums
Tony Garnier – bass
Rosie Flores – vocals
Steven Soles – vocals

References 

1991 albums
Marshall Crenshaw albums
Albums produced by Ed Stasium
MCA Records albums